33 Postcards is a 2011 drama film written and directed by Pauline Chan and starring Guy Pearce. It is the first co-production between China and New South Wales.

Plot
Mei Mei (Zhu Lin) a 16-year-old Chinese orphan who has been supported by donations from her Australian sponsor Dean Randall (Guy Pearce), who sends her postcards that describe his family life. When her orphanage choir travels to Australia to participate in an Australian Choir Festival, Mei Mei takes the opportunity to find Dean with the hope he will make her part of his family. However, Mei Mei discovers the shocking truth – Dean is actually a convict in prison for manslaughter. Seeing Dean as her last chance at finding a home, Mei Mei decides to stay in Sydney until Dean gets his parole, in the meantime becoming naively entangled in the criminal world herself. To save Mei Mei from his own fate, Dean must make an impossible sacrifice.

Development
33 Postcards was developed under the title Mei Mei. In 2009, Mei Mei was one of only two Australian screenplays selected from 475 submissions to partake in the Tribeca Film Institute program, Tribeca All Access. The screenplay also featured as one of only three selected for Dungog Film Festival as part of the in the Raw Program.

Coproduction
33 Postcards is an official film and television co-production in Australia. The co-production is between Australia and China, for which a co-production treaty did not exist prior to 2008. 33 Postcards is only the second film to be produced under this treaty and the first co-production between NSW and China. This opportunity for co-productions to exist between China and Australia is largely unrealised in both countries, but has been identified as a potentially lucrative endeavour.

Production
Lead actress Zhu Lin began production knowing little more than a dozen words in the English language. The film was shot in both Australia and Zhejiang Province, China.

Festivals
33 Postcards has featured and been in competition at the following festivals
 2011 Melbourne International Film Festival
 2011 Sydney International Film Festival – In Competition
 2011 Shanghai Film Festival China – In Competition
 2011 Travelling Film Festival Huskisson Australia
 2011 Singapore International Film Festival
 2011 Hawaii International Film Festival
 2012 Mostly British Film Festival San Francisco 
 2012 Beijing Film Festival China
 2012 Real Film Festival Newcastle, Australia – Closing Night Film
 2012 Newport Beach Film Festival USA
 2012 Fiuggi Family Film Festival Italy – In Competition 
 2012 CinFest OZ – Opening Night Film 
 2012 Chinese International Film Festival
 2012 Raglan Film Festival New Zealand
 2012 Italian Parliamentary Screening
 2012 Canberra International Film Festival 
 2013 Beijing Film Festival – Co-production Case Study 
 2013 Social FIlm Festival Sorrento Italy
 2013 CineMigrante International Film Festival Buenos Aires

Awards

Future
33 Postcards was anticipated for release in the second half of 2011 in Australia and also in China. The film was released to video on demand on 15 April 2013.

References

External links

 
 
 
 

2010s English-language films
2010s Mandarin-language films
2011 films
2011 drama films
Films about orphans
Australian drama films
Chinese drama films
2011 multilingual films
Australian multilingual films
Chinese multilingual films